The Elephant Theatre Company was a non-profit theatre company based in Hollywood. The company "built a reputation for championing new American plays" and ceased operation in September 2015.

History
The Elephant Theatre Company was created in 1995 by David Fofi and Lindsay Allbaugh, with classmates from the California State University, Long Beach Theatre Arts program. They moved into a space at the Angel City Brewery artist complex. The space doubled as both a studio theater and a loft apartment for the original founders. They renovated the space, creating a small theatre and living quarters, and gave it the name of "Elephant Off Main". 

In the summer of 1997, the small 45-seat theater could no longer accommodate the production needs or the increasing audience attendance. The Company then moved to Hollywood (and dropped the “Off Main”). David Fofi along with founding member Don Cesario continued to produce Elephant productions in various Hollywood venues.

During their 1998/1999 season, the company moved to 6322 Santa Monica Boulevard, in Los Angeles' Theatre Row District. 

In 2015, the theatre building was sold by its landlord to a neighboring school. The last produced show ("The Great Divide" by Lyle Kessler) closed on August 23, 2015. The Elephant Theatre was left without a permanent space.

Chronology of Plays
Summer 2015 
The Great Divide''
Written by: Lyle Kessler
Directed by: David Fofi
Produced by: Bren Coombs and Shannon McManus

Spring 2015 7 Redneck Cheerleaders 
Written by: Louis Douglas Jacobs
Directed by: David Fofi
Produced by: Bren Coombs

Winter 2014 Hell Cab 
Written by: Will Kern
Directed by: David Fofi

Fall 2014 Scene Workshop 
Showcase of various company members

Fall 2014 Elephant Short Play Fest 
Short plays written and directed by various company members

Summer 2014 Le Butte 1 
One acts written and directed by various company members

Summer 2014 Unorganized Crimewritten by: Kenny D'Aquila
Directed by: David Fofi

Spring 2014 Derby Day 
written by: Samuel Brett Williams
Directed by: David Fofi

Winter 2014 Twilight of Schlomo 
written by: Timothy McNeil 
Directed by: David Fofi

Summer 2013 Revelation 
written by: Samueal Brett Williams 
Directed by: David Fofi

Spring 2013 The North Plan 
written by: Jason Wells
Directed by: David Fofi

20127 Redneck Cheerleaderswritten by: Louis Douglas Jacobs
Original Staging by: Amy French
Re-staged by: David Fofi & Louis Jacobs

2012Collision 
written by: Lyle Kessler
Directed by: David Fofi

June, 2011Lovesickwritten by: Kristina Poe
Directed by: David Fofi

June, 2011100 Saints You Should Know 
written by: Kate Fodor
Directed by: Lindsay Allbaugh

Feb - March, 2011The 10th Anniversary of Love Bites: 10 Years Together & Still No Ring 
Annual shorts written and directed by various company members

August - Sept, 2010Parasite Drag 
written by: Mark Roberts
Directed by: David Fofi

May - June, 2010Supernova 
written by: Tim McNeil
Directed by: Lindsay Allbaugh

Feb - March, 2010Love Bites Vol. 9 
Annual shorts written and directed by various company members

August, 2009 - Sept, 2009Block Ninewritten by: Tom Stanczk
Directed by: Emilie Beck & Pete Uribe 

May, 2009 - June, 2009The Idea Man 
written by: Kevin King
Directed by: David Fofi

Feb - March, 2009Love Bites Vol. 8.0Annual shorts written and directed by various company members

20087 Redneck Cheerleaders 
written by: Louis Douglas Jacobs
Directed by: Amy French

July, 2008 - Oct, 2008Asleep on a Bicycle 
written by: Tony Foster
Directed by: David Fofi

May, 2008 - June, 2008Tooth and Nail 
written by: Gena Acosta
Directed by: Lindsay Allbaugh

Feb - March, 2008Love Bites VI & VII 
Annual shorts written and directed by various company members

Nov, 2007 - Feb, 2008Anythingwritten by: Tim McNeil
Directed by: David Fofi

August 2007One Fell Swoopwritten by: Robert J. Litz
Directed by: Christopher Game

March 7-April 7Love Bites Vol. VAnnual shorts written and directed by various company members

Jan 07-April 7	In Arabia We’d All Be KingsWritten by: Stephen Adly Guirgis
Directed by: David Fofi

Dec 06365 Days/Plays (week 4: Los Angeles)
Written by: Suzan-Lori Parks
Directed by: Lindsay Allbaugh, David Fofi, and Christopher Game

August-Oct 06Seven Redneck Cheerleaders 
Written by: Louis Jacobs
Original Staging by: Amy French
Re-staged by: David Fofi & Louis Jacobs

March 6Love BitesAnnual shorts written and directed by various company members

Nov 05-Jan 06Los MuertosWritten by: Tim McNeil
Directed by: David Fofi

August 5Seven Redneck CheerleadersWritten by: Louis Jacobs
Directed by: Amy French

May 5Never TellWritten by: James Christy
Directed by: Lindsay Allbaugh

Dec 04Underwear For ChristmasWritten by: Tony Foster
Directed by: Daniel McCoy

Oct 04Love Bites HarderAnnual shorts written and directed by various company members

June 4One WorldWritten by Robert J. Litz
Directed by David Fofi

April 421 StoriesWritten by: G.W. Stevens
Directed by:  Yuval Hadid

Oct 03One Act FestivalAll Men are Whores, and Bobby Gould in Hell written by David Mamet
Not Enough Rope, and Hotline written by Elaine May
Desire, Desire, Desire, ‘Dentiy Crisis and 1-900-Desperate by Christopher Durang

Aug 03RobbersWritten by Lyle Kessler
Directed by David Fofi
Workshop Production with Lyle Kessler, not submitted for review

April 3Some Strings AttachedWritten by: Amy French and Alexandra Hoover
Directed by: Gina Soto

March 3King of ClubsWritten and Directed by: David Fofi

Oct 02ZzyxxWritten by: Don Cesario
Directed by: Kimberly Brooks

Aug 02Serenading LouieWritten by: Lanford Wilson
Directed by: Christopher Game and Gina Soto

April 2Love BitesSeries of one acts written and directed by various company members

Dec 01Red Cross and 4H-ClubWritten by: Sam Shepard
Directed by: Chris Game & Dave Fofi

Nov  01GreystoneWritten by: Tony Foster
Directed by: Kristin Hanggi

June 1	Dearboy's WarWritten by: Mike Ambrose 
Directed by: Danny  LaClair

Dec 00Underwear for ChristmasWritten and Directed by: Tony Foster

Oct 00The Insanity of Mary GirardWritten by: Lanie Robertson
Directed by: Pat McLoy and David Brown

April  00Elephant Shorts, a Collection of Vignettes
Written by: Tony Foster
Directed by: E.O.M. Directors

Nov 99Search & DestroyWritten by: Howard Korder
Directed by: David Fofi & Anthony Roman

May 99The Actors NightmareWritten by: Christopher Durang
Directed by: Christopher Game

May 99Gecko Chestnut GeniusWritten by: Jimmie D. Hudson III
Directed by: Don Cesario

April 99LineWritten by Israel Horowitz
Directed by: Gary BlumsackShooting GalleryWritten by Israel Horowitz
Directed by: Andrea C. RobbinsStage DirectionsWritten by Israel Horowitz
Directed by: Pat McLoy

March 99Indian Summer of Our DespondencyWritten by: Kelly Wand
Directed by: David Fofi

Aug 98Halfway ThereWritten by: Michael Vaez 
Directed by: Christopher Game
at the Hollywood Court Theater, Hollywood

July 97Warmth and DoubtWritten by: David Fofi
Directed by: David Fofi & Andrea RobinsThe Princess and the PeonWritten by: Jimmie D. Hudson, Directed by: Christopher Game
Candlefish Theatre, Los Angeles

Feb 97The Love of NechronWritten and Directed by: Pat McLoy
Elephant Off Main Theatre, Los Angeles

Nov 96CriminalWritten by: David Canales
Directed by: Jeff Walsh

Sept 96	Holding CellWritten by: Mike Vaez 
Directed By: Joe Matthews

May 96Solitary Ping PongWritten by: Jimmie D. Hudson 
Directed by: Lori Lee BushMy Only Hopeless 
Written by: Jackie Apodaca 
Directed by: Christopher Game

March 96King Of ClubsWritten and Directed by: Dave Fofi Adam and RhondaWritten by: Matthew Jones

Nov 95The Galaxy LilyWritten and Directed by: Don Cesario

July 95	Sam Shepard TributeRed CrossDirected by: Christopher Game4-H ClubDirected by David FofiFourteen Hundred Thousand'''
Directed by: Kimberly Brooks

References

Theatre companies in Los Angeles